is a railway station in Kita-ku, Nagoya, Aichi Prefecture, Japan

Lines

 (Station number: M09)

Layout

Platforms

Car Placement
(map to come)

Internal Station Map
(map to come)
Blue denotes upward moving escalators. 
Pink denotes downward moving escalators.

External Exit Placement
(map to come)

Disabled or Injured Route Information
There is an elevator from the platform to the west wicket (exit 2 & 3). To the left of the wicket is an elevator to the ground floor.
There are both stairs and upward moving escalators at both the east and west wickets.
All exits are stairs.

See also

References

Railway stations in Japan opened in 1971
Railway stations in Aichi Prefecture